The Center for an Urban Future is an American public policy think tank based in Manhattan, a borough of New York City in the United States. The Center describes itself as "a catalyst for smart and sustainable policies that reduce inequality, increase economic mobility, and grow the economy in New York City" with a focus on shaping "the policy debate around economic opportunity in New York." 

The Center for an Urban Future was founded in 1996 as an offshoot of City Limits Magazine. In November 2009, the corporate parent of the Center, City Futures, Inc., announced the transfer of City Limits Magazine and website to the Community Service Society of New York, leaving the nonpartisan think tank independent of the magazine. The Center for an Urban Future's reports have received extensive media coverage, including in The New York Times, Wall Street Journal, Time magazine, Crain's New York Business, New York Daily News, and WNYC. The Center for an Urban Future is sometimes considered a less ideological and more progressive alternative to the Manhattan Institute. Its research and recommendations have been adopted dozens of times by both the Bloomberg and de Blasio administrations, as well as other state and local policymakers. The current executive director is Jonathan Bowles.

References

External links
Center for an Urban Future website

Think tanks based in the United States